Kỳ Sơn may refer to several places in Vietnam:

Kỳ Sơn District, a rural district of Nghệ An Province
Kỳ Sơn, Hòa Bình, a township and capital of Kỳ Sơn District, Hòa Bình Province
Kỳ Sơn, Haiphong, a commune of Thủy Nguyên District
Kỳ Sơn, Hà Tĩnh, a commune of Kỳ Anh District
Kỳ Sơn, Tân Kỳ, a commune of Tân Kỳ District, Nghệ An Province
Former Kỳ Sơn District of Hòa Bình Province
Kỳ Sơn, Hải Dương, a former commune of Tứ Kỳ District